Vũ Hồng Khanh (1898 – 14 November 1993) born Vũ Văn Giảng, was a Vietnamese revolutionary of the Việt Nam Quốc Dân Đảng faction.

Vũ Hồng Khanh left Vietnam for Yunnan during the French colonial crackdown of 1930 and enrolled in a Kuomintang military school in Kunming. He graduated and was granted a commission in the Nationalist Chinese Twentieth Army Corps, where he rose quickly to the rank of brigadier general. In 1941 he took on the role of head of a school training Vietnamese, Burmese and Thai recruits. He became the vice-president of the "Government of National Unity," March to October 1946. After Mao declared a communist state in Beijing in 1949 the exiled Vietnamese nationalists in China formed the Liên Minh, supporting Cường Để and opposing both the French and the communists. Following the fall of Guangzhou to the communists the headquarters of the exiles moved to Hainan island, and Vũ Hồng Khanh became the leader of the part of the organisation which was to operate within Vietnam.

Khanh retired to his home village of làng Thổ Tang, modern Vĩnh Tường District, where he died at the age of 95.

References

1898 births
1993 deaths
Vietnamese nationalists
Vietnamese revolutionaries
People from Vĩnh Phúc province
Vietnamese expatriates in China